Simone Jade Mackinnon (born 19 March 1973) is an Australian actress. She is best known for role as Allie Reese on Baywatch (1999–2000) and Stevie Hall on McLeod's Daughters (2003–2009).

Early life
Mackinnon was born in Mount Isa, Queensland in 1973 to Ian and Annette Mackinnon. She has a brother and a sister, Robbie and Kym. She and her family later moved to Coffs Harbour in New South Wales.

Career
Mackinnon began her acting career in 1988, appearing in the Australian feature film Something About Love. Two further features followed, Dating the Enemy and Dust of the Wings, where she appeared in small roles, although her role in Dust of the Wing was a larger part. In 1997, she began to appear on television. She had a guest appearance on the fantasy television series Spellbinder: Land of the Dragon Lord, a sequel to the original series Spellbinder. Mackinnon is known for her role in Baywatch: Hawaii, where she played the role of 'Allie Reese' opposite David Hasselhoff. MacKinnon is best known for her role as 'Stevie Hall' (later 'Hall-Ryan') in the Logie Award-winning Australian television series McLeod's Daughters, where she appeared at the end of season three through the final season in 2009. Her role as Stevie earned her several Logie Award nominations, for Most Popular New Female Talent and Most Popular Actress. In 2007 & 2009, she received Gold Logie Award nominations. Mackinnon's other television work includes roles on Water Rats, All Saints, Sir Arthur Conan Doyle's The Lost World, The Cut, Rescue: Special Ops, Cops L.A.C. and City Homicide. In 2001, she appeared with Powers Boothe in the television mini-series Attila, which also featured Gerard Butler, and in 2003, she starred in the Syfy television film Deep Shock. Mackinnon also played roles in three direct-to-video films, Python, Dark Waters and Submission, for which she also served as producer.

From 1993 to 1995 she toured with the musical Cats (in the role of the cat "Cassandra") through Australia and Asia. In June 2009, Mackinnon appeared as a presenter alongside host Karl Stefanovic and Scott Cam in Random Acts of Kindness on the Nine Network. Mackinnon completed a second season of Random Acts of Kindness in January 2010.

On 4 March 2012, it was announced Mackinnon had joined the cast of Neighbours as Zoe Alexander. The actress began appearing on screen in May and relocated to Melbourne for filming.

Personal life

Mackinnon gave birth to her first child, a son, Madigan James Mackinnon, on 19 March 2010, her 37th birthday.

Dogs have always been a part of her life. She was named an RSPCA superhero "for giving love, respect and support to all animals." As a child traveling with her parents, she found an abandoned Australian Cattle Dog, and since then has had ACDs in her life. Her current dogs are Duke and Kevin.

Filmography

References

External links 

Australian film actresses
Australian television actresses
People from Coffs Harbour
Living people
1973 births
People from Mount Isa
20th-century American actresses
21st-century American actresses